Velja Međa is a village in the municipality of Ravno, Bosnia and Herzegovina. The village is populated by Croats.

Demographics 
According to the 2013 census, its population was 203, all Croats.

References

Populated places in Ravno, Bosnia and Herzegovina